Claudia Kohde-Kilsch (née Kohde; born 11 December 1963) is a former German tennis player and member of the Die Linke. During her tennis career, she won two women's doubles Grand Slam titles. She also won eight singles titles and a total of 25 doubles titles.

Personal life
Kohde-Kilsch was born Claudia Kohde in Saarbrücken, but added the hyphenated "-Kilsch" to her name which came from her adoptive father Jürgen Kilsch, an attorney. She has a younger sister, Katrin. She began playing tennis aged 5, and was soon a rising junior player.

Kohde-Kilsch campaigned for Oskar Lafontaine of Die Linke at the 2012 Saarland state election. With the party winning over 16% of the vote, it was announced that as of 1 May 2012 she would become the new spokesperson for the Landtag parliamentary group.

She currently lives in Saarland with her partner and her son Fynn from her previous marriage with the singer Chris Bennett, from whom she divorced in 2011. Bennett died in 2018. The couple operated CeKay Music, a music publishing house and production company.

Career
Kohde-Kilsch turned professional on 1 January 1980, and by 1981, she had defeated Martina Navratilova in Oakland. In 1982, she captured the title at Pittsburgh, and in 1984, she triumphed at the German Open, defeating Kathleen Horvath of the United States, 7–6, 6–1.

In 1985, she reached the Australian Open and French Open semifinals as well as won in Los Angeles. Later that year, she defeated Navrátilová in the quarterfinals at the Canadian Open, eventually losing to Chris Evert, 2–6, 4–6 in the final. In 1987, she again reached the finals of the German Open, where she lost to Steffi Graf 2–6, 3–6.

In women's doubles, Kohde-Kilsch and Helena Suková won the 1985 US Open and the 1987 Wimbledon Championships.

Between 1984 and 1987, Kohde-Kilsch and Suková, sometimes referred to as the "twin towers" for their height, won 14 doubles tournaments. At the 1988 Summer Olympics, she partnered with Steffi Graf in the doubles competition, and they won the bronze medal in the event.

Major finals

Grand Slam tournaments

Women's doubles: 8 (2 titles, 6 runners-up)

Olympics

Doubles: 1 bronze medal

Graf and Kohde-Kilsch lost in the semifinals to Jana Novotná and Helena Suková 5–7, 3–6. In 1988, there was no bronze medal play-off match, both beaten semifinal pairs received bronze medals.

Year-end championships

Doubles: 5 runners-up

WTA career finals

Singles: 16 (8–8)

Doubles: 64 (25–39)

Performance timelines

Singles

Doubles

References

External links
 Official website 
 
 
 

1963 births
Living people
Sportspeople from Saarbrücken
Sportspeople from Saarland
German female tennis players
West German female tennis players
German expatriates in Monaco
Olympic tennis players of West Germany
Tennis players at the 1988 Summer Olympics
Olympic bronze medalists for West Germany
Olympic medalists in tennis
US Open (tennis) champions
Wimbledon champions
Grand Slam (tennis) champions in women's doubles
The Left (Germany) politicians
21st-century German politicians
Medalists at the 1988 Summer Olympics
21st-century German women